This is a list of internet service providers in India. There were 584 internet service providers (ISPs) offering broadband and narrow band internet services in India as of 30 September 2021.

By subscribers
Broadband is defined by the Telecom Regulatory Authority of India as "an always-on data connection ... that offers a minimum downlink and uplink speed of 2 Mbps". The number of internet users are 83,42,88,767 (83Crore+) out of which 3,94,07,323 (3Crore+) are narrow band subscribers and 79,48,81,444 (79Crore+) are broadband subscribers. The following table shows the top 4 ISPs in India by total subscriber base as of 30 September 2021. 

Note:

 On 28 February 2018 Aircel filed for bankruptcy at NCLT and a substantial number of customers have migrated to other services due to closing down of most of the consumer services.
The services of Telenor India has been merged with Airtel on 14 May 2018.
 On 31 August 2018, Vodafone India has been merged with Idea Cellular and renamed as Vodafone Idea Limited.

Other notable ISPs

Enterprise/wholesale only
National Knowledge Network for educational institutions in India
PowerGrid

See also 
 List of telecom companies in India
 Internet in India

References

External links
 ISP market share grouped by ASNs used (APNIC report)
 List of ASNs assigned to India
 DoT website
 List of Telecom Service Providers on TRAI website

Internet-related lists